KLGE (94.1 FM) is a radio station in Hydesville, California, serving the Eureka area. KLGE broadcasts an original format blending vintage vocal jazz with contemporary electronica and swing. The station is owned by Lost Coast Communications, Inc. KLGE brands itself as "94.1 - The Lounge". Larry Trask (formally of KHUM) is the Program Director/Music Director of KLGE.

External links

LGE
Adult standards radio stations in the United States
Mass media in Humboldt County, California
Radio stations established in 2001
2001 establishments in California